'John Forster may refer to:
 Sir John Forster (soldier) (1520–1602), English military commander and Warden of the Middle Marches
 John Forster (biographer) (1812–1876), English biographer and critic
 John Forster (MP) (1817–1878), British politician, MP for Oxford
 John Forster (Chief Justice) (1667–1720), Irish lawyer and politician
 John Forster (colonial administrator) (died 1748), British administrator and President of Bengal
 John Cooper Forster (1823–1886), British surgeon
 John (Don Juan) Forster (1814–1882), California landowner
 John Wycliffe Lowes Forster (1850–1938), Canadian artist
 John Forster, 1st Baron Forster of Harraby (1888–1972), British barrister  
 John Forster (died 1558)
 John Forster (footballer) (born 1948), Australian footballer
 John Forster (musician) (born 1948), American cabaret musician
 John Forster (British Army officer) (1856–1938), British Army officer

See also
 Johann Reinhold Forster (1729–1798), German naturalist
 John Foster (disambiguation)